Poljane  may refer to the following places:

In Kosovo:

 Poljane, Istok, a settlement in the Municipality of Istok

In Serbia:

 Poljane (Obrenovac), a village in the Municipality of Obrenovac

In Slovenia:

 Dolenje Poljane, a settlement in the Municipality of Loška Dolina, southern Slovenia
 Kočevske Poljane, a settlement in the Municipality of Dolenjske Toplice (named Poljane until 1953), southeastern Slovenia
 Male Poljane, a settlement in the Municipality of Škocjan, southeastern Slovenia
 Poljane, Cerkno, a settlement in the Municipality of Cerkno, western Slovenia
 Poljane nad Blagovico, a settlement in the Municipality of Lukovica, central Slovenia
 Poljane nad Škofjo Loko, a settlement in the Municipality of Gorenja Vas–Poljane, northwestern Slovenia
 Poljane pri Podgradu, a settlement in the Municipality of Hrpelje–Kozina, southwestern Slovenia
 Poljane pri Štjaku, a settlement in the Municipality of Sežana, southwestern Slovenia
 Poljane, Rečica ob Savinji, a settlement in the Municipality of Rečica ob Savinji, central-eastern Slovenia
 Velike Poljane, Ribnica, a settlement in the Municipality of Ribnica, southern Slovenia
 Velike Poljane, Škocjan, a settlement in the Municipality of Škocjan, southeastern Slovenia
 Poljane (Šentvid District), a former settlement in central Slovenia in the northwest part of Ljubljana

See also
 
 Poljana (disambiguation)